Miss Universe Spain 2022 will be the 10th edition of the Miss Universe Spain pageant. Sarah Loinaz of País Vasco crowned Alicia Faubel of Valencia at the end of the pageant. Faubel will represent Spain at the upcoming Miss Universe 2022 pageant.

Final results

Candidates 
These are the contestants who competed for the title.

References

External links 

 Official Website of Nuestra Belleza España
 Miss Universe Spain Official Website

Miss Spain
2022 beauty pageants